George Benjamin DeLuca (September 20, 1889 – May 2, 1983) was an American lawyer, banker and politician. He was Lieutenant Governor of New York from 1955 to 1958.

Life

He was the son of Mariano DeLuca and Catherine (Bonetti) DeLuca. His parents came to the United States in the 1880s from the Province of Belluno.

He was Bronx County District Attorney from 1950 to 1954. He was Lieutenant Governor of New York from 1955 to 1958, elected on the Democratic ticket with Governor W. Averell Harriman in 1954, but defeated for re-election in 1958. He was a delegate to the 1956 and 1960 Democratic National Conventions.

He was a vice president of the Commercial Bank of America, elected in 1959.

He lived in Riverdale, in the Bronx.

He died at North Central Bronx Hospital.

References

Sources
 Political Graveyard
George DeLuca, 93, Ex-Judge and 50's Lieutenant Governor Obituary in New York Times, May 3, 1983.

1889 births
1983 deaths
Lieutenant Governors of New York (state)
Bronx County District Attorneys
Politicians from the Bronx
American bankers
20th-century American politicians
American people of Italian descent